Jalan Lembah Bujang (or Jalan Merbok—Merbok Temple; Kedah state route K631) is a major road to Lembah Bujang Archeology Museum in Selangor, Malaysia. The 1.8-km section of this road connects Bedong, Kuala Muda, to Bujang Valley Archeology Museum.

List of junctions

Roads in Kedah